Haakon Arnold (born Haakon Ingemann Arnold Eriksen, March 18, 1897 – April 16, 1968) was a Norwegian actor.

Arnold was engaged with the Oslo New Theater from 1935 to 1949, and with the National Theater in Oslo from 1949 to 1962. In addition to theater, he worked as a film actor in supporting roles. He made his film debut in Alfred Maurstad's Hansen og Hansen in 1941, and he appeared in a total of 15 films until 1961.

Filmography
1941: Hansen og Hansen as a detective
1942: Trysil-Knut as a raftsman
1942: Det æ'kke te å tru as the clerk at the employment office
1943: Den nye lægen as Antonsen
1943: Vigdis as the registrar
1948: Kampen om tungtvannet
1949: Døden er et kjærtegn as Olsen the constable
1951: Vi gifter oss as an agent
1951: Storfolk og småfolk as Lars Kampesveen
1951: Ukjent mann as the electrical controller
1953: Skøytekongen
1956: Kvinnens plass
1956: På solsiden as the man on the pier
1957: Stevnemøte med glemte år as an officer
1961: Hans Nielsen Hauge as the policeman

References

External links
 
 Haakon Arnold at Sceneweb
 Haakon Arnold at Filmfront

1897 births
1968 deaths
Norwegian male stage actors
Norwegian male film actors
20th-century Norwegian male actors
People from Fredrikstad